David Wetmore Pickett (December 24, 1865 – November 30, 1933) was a Canadian politician. He served in the Legislative Assembly of New Brunswick from 1921 to 1925 as member of the United Farmers. He died in 1933.

References 

1865 births
1933 deaths